Pandionis is a phyle (tribe or clan) of ancient Attica, which had eleven demes at the time of its creation, which is when the phyle was created as part of a group of ten phylai.

The names of the demes of Pandionis are Angele, Konthyle, Kydathenaion, Kytheros, Myrrhinous, Oa, Lower Paiania, Upper Paiania, Prasiai, Probalinthos, Steiria.

Citations

Tribes of ancient Attica